Snoa is a Swedish couple dance involving a simple pivot-spin step in  duple-meter time. It is related to the Norwegian rudl or rull dance, which is often in a  meter. The Swedish word Snoa, meaning "to turn or rotate", is used throughout a good part of northern Sweden to identify this dance.

References

External links
 YouTube video of Snoa dance and music: 081010 Lohärad: Allspel Snurran Snoa

Swedish folk dances